Hubneria is a genus of flies in the family Tachinidae.

Species
Hubneria affinis (Fallén, 1810)
Hubneria estigmenensis (Sellers, 1943)

References

Diptera of Europe
Diptera of Asia
Diptera of North America
Exoristinae
Tachinidae genera
Taxa named by Jean-Baptiste Robineau-Desvoidy